Leonora of Castile or Eleanor of Castile may refer to:

 Eleanor of England, Queen of Castile (1162–1214), wife of Alfonso VIII, who brought the name into the Castilian Royal Dynasty
 Eleanor of Castile (died 1244), queen consort of Aragon, wife of James I of Aragon
 Eleanor of Castile (1241–1290), queen consort England, wife of Edward I, daughter of Ferdinand III of Castile and Joan, Countess of Ponthieu
 Eleanor of Castile (1307–1359), queen consort of Aragon, wife of Alfonso IV of Aragon, daughter of Ferdinand IV of Castile
 Eleanor of Aragon, Queen of Castile (1358–1382), wife of John I of Castile, daughter of Peter IV of Aragon and Eleanor of Sicily
 Eleanor of Castile, Queen of Navarre (fl. 1363–1416), queen consort of Navarre, wife of Charles III, daughter of Henry II of Castile, mother of Blanche of Navarre
 Eleanor of Austria (1498–1558), wife of Manuel I of Portugal and Francis I of France, daughter of Joanna of Castile and Philip the Handsome of Austria-Burgundy